Zea may refer to:

Nature
Zea (plant), a genus of large grasses, including: 
Zea mays, commonly known as maize or corn
Zea (skipper), a genus of butterflies
Helicoverpa zea, the corn earworm, a major agricultural pest
ZEA, an abbreviation for the mycotoxin zearalenone

People and places
Zea (surname), a surname
Zea (island), an island of the Cyclades archipelago
Bay of Zea, one of the harbours of Piraeus in Athens, Greece
Zea Harbour Project, a Danish-Greek archaeological project

Other uses
Zea (Bread), a Greek bread made from farro or "zea," as it is known in Greek.
Zea (EP), a 1993 alternative EP from dEUS
Zea (film), a 1981 short film
ZE:A, a South Korean boy band
zea, the language code abbreviation for Zeelandic, a West Flemish dialect of Dutch

See also
 Teosinte (disambiguation)